W. L. Saunders may refer to:
Wilfred Leonard Saunders (1920-2007), British librarian and academic
 William Lawrence Saunders (1856-1931), American mining engineer